The Battle of Waterloo reenactment is an annual modern recreation of the 19th century Battle of Waterloo on the original battlefield in Waterloo, Belgium. 
	
It is held every June on the weekend nearest to the historic date of the Battle of Waterloo (18 June 1815). In a regular year there will be 600–800 reenactors. The 5-year-anniversaries are greater events with 1,500–2,000 reenactors from France, Belgium, The Netherlands, Great Britain, USA, Germany, Poland, Russia, Sweden, Finland, Spain, Portugal, Argentina and Chile among others.

Waterloo 2015
A major event, one of the largest ever staged, was held on the site of the battle to mark the 200th anniversary of the engagement.  6,200 re-enactors, 330 horses, and 120 cannons took part in actions in an arena area close to La Haye Sainte.  During the event, the Allied Army was camped at Hougoumont, with the French camped about a mile away from La Caillou. 

The event was opened with a poetic interpretation of the Battle, created by Luc Petit.  The show was located on a stage 150 metres long, with giant projector screens, pyrotechnics, dancers, classical musicians and local choirs – in addition to cast members drawn from the re-enactment groups.  Three re-enactors were injured by explosives during this production, with one being taken to hospital with serious burns.

Gallery

See also
 Waterloo (1970 film)

References

External links

 Official Battle of Waterloo site 
 History fans recreate Waterloo BBC
 360° Battle of Waterloo National Geographic
 Unseen Waterloo - The Conflict Revisited
Historical reenactment events
Military reenactment
Reenactment